Alfred Birkett (3 August 1908 – 8 February 1960) was a South African cricket umpire. He stood in two Test matches between 1957 and 1958.

See also
 List of Test cricket umpires

References

1908 births
1960 deaths
Place of birth missing
South African Test cricket umpires